Bradford English (born 1943) is an American character actor known for his roles in film and television. He is best known in the horror film community for his role in the 1995 horror movie Halloween: The Curse of Michael Myers as John Strode. His first movie role was in the 1971 movie The Anderson Tapes, he also starred in the 1979 movie The Onion Field.

English has made guest appearances on many TV shows. His appearances range from Kojak, Diff'rent Strokes, The A-Team, Hunter, Seinfeld, Alien Nation, NYPD Blue, 21 Jump Street, Brooklyn South, and Crossing Jordan and Mad Men.

Filmography

Film

Television

External links

1943 births
American male film actors
American male television actors
Living people